Katia Noyes is an American author whose works have appeared in many publications and anthologies. Her debut novel, Crashing America, was a Book Sense Notable Book in 2005, and was chosen as one of the Ten Best Gay/Lesbian Books of 2005 by Amazon.com and the UK's Rainbow Network.

A third generation Californian who was raised on the Stanford University campus, Noyes lives in the Glen Park neighborhood of San Francisco.

References

External links
 Official website
 Katia Noyes interview by the United Kingdom's Lucia Pajon in Libertas
 Filmmaker George Csicery's review of "Crashing America" in Bookslut magazine

21st-century American novelists
American women novelists
Living people
American lesbian writers
American LGBT novelists
21st-century American women writers
Year of birth missing (living people)